The Right Reverend John Chang Yik (November 20, 1933, Seoul – August 5, 2020, Chuncheon) was the Bishop of the Roman Catholic Diocese of Chunchon, South Korea.

The son of Chang Myon, he was born as Chang Yik. On 30 March 1963, aged 29, he was ordained a parish priest. On 11 November 1994, aged 61, he was appointed as Bishop of Chuncheon and ordained a month later. His consecrators were: Stephen Cardinal Kim Sou-hwan, Archbishop Victorinus Youn Kong-hi and Nicolas Cardinal Cheong Jin-suk.  He was appointed Apostolic Administrator of Hamhung in North Korea in 2006; he retired from both posts in 2010.

References

External links 
Biodata at Catholic Hierarchy website

1933 births
2020 deaths
20th-century Roman Catholic bishops in South Korea
21st-century Roman Catholic bishops in South Korea
South Korean Roman Catholic bishops
People from Seoul
Indong Jang clan
Roman Catholic bishops of Hamhung
Roman Catholic bishops of Chunchon